Morgan Evans EP is the third extended play by Australian country music singer Morgan Evans. The EP was produced by Chris DeStefano, and was released on 10 August 2018.

Track listing

Personnel
Chris DeStefano - banjo, bass guitar, drums, acoustic guitar, electric guitar, piano, programming, background vocals
Morgan Evans - acoustic guitar, lead vocals, background vocals
Nir Z. - drums

Release history

References

2018 EPs
EPs by Australian artists
Morgan Evans (singer) albums